Everywhere That I'm Not: A Retrospective was a greatest hits album released by San Francisco new wave group Translator in 1986.

Track listing
"Everywhere That I'm Not"
"Sleeping Snakes"
"O Lazarus"
"Un-Alone"
"Gravity"
"Today"
"I Need You to Love"
"Everywhere"
"Standing in Line"
"When I Am With You"
"These Old Days"
"I Hear You Follow"

References

1986 greatest hits albums
Translator (band) albums
Albums produced by David Kahne
Albums produced by Ed Stasium
Columbia Records compilation albums